Allan-Roméo Nyom (born 10 May 1988) is a professional footballer who plays as a right back for Spanish club CD Leganés. 

He spent most of his career with Granada, appearing in 220 competitive games during six seasons, four in La Liga. He also played professionally in England, with Watford and West Bromwich Albion.

Born in France, Nyom has been a Cameroonian international since 2011. He represented the nation at the 2014 World Cup.

Club career

Early years, Granada
Born in Neuilly-sur-Seine, France, Nyom only played amateur football in the country, competing in the reserves championship with AS Nancy-Lorraine and appearing for AC Arles-Avignon in the Championnat National. In the summer of 2009 he was signed by Udinese Calcio from Italy, and was immediately loaned to Granada CF in Spain as part of the partnership agreement between both clubs.

Nyom quickly became an undisputed first-choice with the Andalusia side, helping them promote from Segunda División B to La Liga in just two seasons. He made his debut in the latter competition on 27 August 2011, in a 0–1 home loss against neighbours Real Betis.

Nyom renewed his contract with Udinese in late May 2013, but continued playing with Granada. He scored his first and only goal in the Spanish top flight on 25 October 2014, putting the visitors ahead in a 1–1 draw at SD Eibar.

Watford
On 14 July 2015, Nyom signed for newly promoted Premier League team Watford on a four-year contract from Udinese. He made his debut on 8 August, starting in a 2–2 draw at Everton.

West Bromwich Albion
On 31 August 2016, Nyom joined fellow Premier League team West Bromwich Albion for an undisclosed fee. After establishing himself in the starting lineup he got his first assist in a 4–0 home win against Burnley, on 22 November.

Nyom returned to the Spanish top flight in the summer of 2018, signing with CD Leganés on a season-long loan deal. He made his debut for the club on 16 September, playing 85 minutes in a 0–1 home loss against Villarreal CF. He scored his only goal for them three months later, in a 1–1 draw to Getafe CF also at Estadio Municipal de Butarque.

Getafe
On 24 July 2019, after his loan spell with Lega ended, Nyom joined Getafe on a two-year contract with an option for another – West Bromwich continued to report to FIFA asking for a £2.7million compensation. On 28 January 2022, he terminated his contract with the club.

Leganés
Nyom returned to Leganés on 28 January 2022, signing a 18-month contract.

International career

Nyom opted to represent Cameroon internationally, and earned his first cap on 11 November 2011 in a 3–1 friendly win against Sudan. He was selected by manager Volker Finke for his 2014 FIFA World Cup squad, and made his debut in the tournament on 23 June against Brazil with the "Indomitable Lions" already eliminated from the knockout phase after two losses. He provided the cross for Joël Matip's equalizer shortly before the 30-minute mark, but the hosts eventually won 4–1.

Now he has played 18 matches in the form of the main team of this African country.

Career statistics

Club

Honours
Granada
Segunda División B: 2009–10

References

External links

1988 births
Living people
Sportspeople from Neuilly-sur-Seine
French sportspeople of Cameroonian descent
Citizens of Cameroon through descent
French footballers
Cameroonian footballers
Association football defenders
Championnat National players
AS Choisy-le-Roi players
AS Nancy Lorraine players
AC Arlésien players
Udinese Calcio players
La Liga players
Segunda División players
Segunda División B players
Granada CF footballers
CD Leganés players
Getafe CF footballers
Premier League players
English Football League players
Watford F.C. players
West Bromwich Albion F.C. players
Cameroon international footballers
2014 FIFA World Cup players
French expatriate footballers
Cameroonian expatriate footballers
Expatriate footballers in Spain
Expatriate footballers in England
French expatriate sportspeople in Spain
French expatriate sportspeople in England
Cameroonian expatriate sportspeople in Spain
Cameroonian expatriate sportspeople in England
Footballers from Hauts-de-Seine